is a former Japanese football player. He played for Japan national team.

Club career
Nakamoto was born in Hiroshima Prefecture on October 29, 1959. After graduating from Chuo University, he joined Nippon Kokan (later NKK) in 1982. From 1985, the club won 2nd place for 3 years in a row. In 1987, the club won JSL Cup. He retired in 1991.

National team career
In August 1979, when Nakamoto was a Chuo University student, he was selected Japan U-20 national team for 1979 World Youth Championship. He played 3 matches. In September 1987, he was selected Japan national team for 1988 Summer Olympics qualification. At this qualification, on September 2, he debuted against Thailand. He played 5 games for Japan in 1987.

Club statistics

National team statistics

References

External links

Japan National Football Team Database

1959 births
Living people
Chuo University alumni
Association football people from Hiroshima Prefecture
Japanese footballers
Japan youth international footballers
Japan international footballers
Japan Soccer League players
NKK SC players
Association football defenders